Saros Islands (also called Üçadalar or Eşek Islands) are  three small Aegean islands in the Gulf of Saros , Turkey. At  they are administratively a part of Gelibolu ilçe (district) of Çanakkale Province. The biggest of the three is Kaşık Island (also called Hedef or Yunus Island) at the west. The middle one is Ortanca (also called Defne Island ) and the smallest one to the east is Böcek Island. The islands are uninhabited and they are controlled by the navy.

References

Aegean islands
Islands of Turkey
Islands of Çanakkale Province
Gelibolu District